Zhao Ermi (1930 – 24 December 2016) was a Chinese herpetologist, born in Chengdu. His ancestors were Manchu Bannerman of Irgen Gioro clan who were stationed in Chengdu during Qing Dynasty. He was elected a member of the Chinese Academy of Sciences in 2001. He died at West China Medical Center of Sichuan University on 24 December 2016.

Taxa named after him
Zhao is commemorated in the scientific names of four taxa of reptiles.
Zhaoermia , a genus of pitviper (synonym of Protobothrops)
Cyrtodactylus zhaoermii , a species of gecko
Diploderma zhaoermii , a species of lizard
Thermophis zhaoermii , a species of snake

Also, two amphibian species have been named after him.
Paramesotriton ermizhaoi , a species of newt (synonym of Paramesotriton labiatus)
Onychodactylus zhaoermii , a species of salamander

Described taxa

Achalinus meiguensis 
Amolops liangshanensis 
Amphiesma optatum 
Calotes medogensis 
Cuora zhoui 
Cyrtopodion medogense 
Dinodon rosozonatum 
Gloydius shedaoensis 
Hebius metusia 
Ingerana reticulata 
Kurixalus hainanus  (synonym of Kurixalus bisacculus)
Laudakia papenfussi 
Laudakia wui 
Liua 
Liuixalus 
Oligodon multizonatus 
Opisthotropis cheni 
Opisthotropis guangxiensis 
Oreolalax multipunctatus 
Pelophylax tenggerensis 
Phrynocephalus albolineatus 
Plagiopholis unipostocularis 
Plestiodon liui 
Protobothrops xiangchengensis 
Rana zhengi 
Rhabdophis adleri 
Scincella huanrenensis 
Scincella tsinlingensis 
Viridovipera medoensis 
Xenopeltis hainanensis 
Protobothrops mangshanensis

References

1930 births
2016 deaths
Biologists from Sichuan
Chinese zoologists
Irgen Gioro
Manchu people
Members of the Chinese Academy of Sciences
People from Chengdu
People of the Republic of China